The University of Arkansas at Little Rock (UA Little Rock) is a public research university in Little Rock, Arkansas. Established as Little Rock Junior College by the Little Rock School District in 1927, the institution became a private four-year university under the name Little Rock University in 1957. It returned to public status in 1969 when it merged with the University of Arkansas System under its present name. The former campus of Little Rock Junior College is now (2019) the campus of Philander Smith College.

It is classified among "R2: Doctoral Universities – High research activity".

Academics

The university features more than 100 undergraduate degrees and 60 graduate degrees, including graduate certificates, master's degrees, and doctorates, through both traditional and online courses. Students attend classes in one of the university's three new colleges and a law school:
 College of Business, Health, and Human Services
 College of Humanities, Arts, Social Sciences, and Education
 Donaghey College of Science, Technology, Engineering, and Mathematics
 William H. Bowen School of Law

Student life

The student life at UA Little Rock is typical of public universities in the United States. It is characterized by student-run organizations and affiliation groups that support social, academic, athletic and religious activities and interests. Some of the services offered by the UA Little Rock Office of Campus Life are intramural sports and fitness programs, diversity programs, leadership development, peer tutoring, student government association, student support programs including groups for non-traditional and first generation students, a student-run newspaper, and fraternity and sorority life. The proximity of the UA Little Rock campus to downtown Little Rock enables students to take advantage of a wide array of recreational, entertainment, educational, internship and employment opportunities that are not available anywhere else in Arkansas.

Campus living

UA Little Rock provides a variety of on-campus living options for students ranging from traditional resident rooms to multiple bedroom apartments. The university has four residence halls on the eastern side of the campus and the University Village Apartment Complex on the southern side of campus. Six learning communities focusing on criminal justice, arts and culture, majors and careers, future business innovators, nursing careers, and STEM are available to students.

Athletics

UA Little Rock's 14 athletic teams are known as the Little Rock Trojans, with almost all teams participating in the Sun Belt Conference. Little Rock is one of two Sun Belt members that do not sponsor football (UT Arlington being the other); UA Little Rock last fielded a football team in 1955 when it was known as Little Rock Junior College. Little Rock's main athletic offices are located in the Jack Stephens Center. UA Little Rock offers the following sports:

 Baseball
 Men's and Women's Basketball
 Men's and Women's Golf
 Women's Volleyball
 Women's Soccer
 Women's Swimming/Diving
 Men's and Women's Cross Country
 Men's and Women's Track and Field (Indoor and Outdoor)
 Men's wrestling

Two Little Rock teams that do not compete in the Sun Belt are the women's swimming and diving team (Missouri Valley Conference) and wrestling (Pac-12 Conference), neither of which the Sun Belt sponsors. Wrestling is the school's newest sport, starting in 2019 and is the first Division I program in Arkansas.

Little Rock will move to the Ohio Valley Conference for the 2022-23 season.

Collections and archives
On July 1, 2014, the UA Little Rock Collections and Archives division was created. The division encompasses:
Ottenheimer Library
Center for Arkansas History and Culture
Sequoyah National Research Center

Weekend programs
The Japanese School of Little Rock (リトルロック日本語補習校 Ritoru Rokku Nihongo Hoshūkō), a weekend Japanese education program, holds its classes at the University Plaza.

Notable students and alumni

Government
Camille Bennett – Arkansas House of Representatives, 2015–present
Karilyn Brown – Arkansas House of Representatives, 2015–present 
James Richard Cheek (1957) – U.S. Ambassador to El Salvador (1979–1981), Ethiopia (1985–1988), Sudan (1989–1992) and Argentina (1993–1996)
Charlie Daniels (attended) – Arkansas Commissioner of State Lands (1985–2001), Arkansas Secretary of State (2002–2010), Arkansas State Auditor (2001–present)
Vivian Flowers (B.S. in political science) – Arkansas House of Representatives, 2015–present
Kenneth Henderson - Arkansas House of Representatives, 2015–present 
Douglas House (1976) Arkansas House of Representatives, 2013–present
Allen Kerr (attended) – Arkansas Insurance Commissioner (2015–present) and former member of the Arkansas House of Representatives
Mike Ross (1987) – U.S. House of Representatives, 2001–2013
Bill Sample (attended) – Arkansas House of Representatives, 2005–2010; Arkansas Senate 2011–present
 Robert William Schroeder III (1989) - U.S. District Court, Eastern District of Texas, Nominated June 2014
 Frank Scott Jr. – current mayor of Little Rock, AR.
Vic Snyder (1988) – U.S. House of Representatives, 1997–2011
James Sturch – (B.S., Political Science) – Arkansas House of Representatives, 2015–present

Education
James E. Cofer – Ed.D. alumnus, former UA Little Rock professor, and former president of both Missouri State University and the University of Louisiana at Monroe

Entertainment
Julie Adams (1946) – Actress (film & television)
Symone (2017) - Drag Performer & Model (winner of Rupaul's Drag Race Season 13)

Athletics
 Malik Dixon - basketball player, top scorer in the 2005 Israel Basketball Premier League
Derek Fisher – Former Los Angeles Lakers player and New York Knicks head coach
 Rayjon Tucker - Professional basketball player in the NBA with Milwaukee Bucks

Notes

References

External links

 

 
1927 establishments in Arkansas
Aftermath of World War I in the United States
Educational institutions established in 1927
Universities and colleges in Little Rock, Arkansas
Little Rock